"The Death of Buffy" is a story arc that ran through Buffy the Vampire Slayer #43–45 based on the Buffy the Vampire Slayer television series. The arc was later collected in a trade paperback edition.

Lost & Found

Story description

Following the events of "The Gift", Buffy's friends are trying to live on without the slayer. However their emotional states remain unbalanced. A demon feeds off their emotions.

The Death of Buffy

Story description

Buffy the Vampire Slayer #43

Comic title: The Death of Buffy, part 1 

Buffy is dead. The Scooby Gang soon realize that Sunnydale will lose control over the dark forces. Willow takes lead but soon Sunnydale is under attack from disgruntled lizard-demons.

Buffy the Vampire Slayer #44

Comic title: The Death of Buffy, part 2 

Willow, Xander, and the Scooby Gang try to fight off the lizard wizards. They had come to remove the Slayer but found that Buffy was already dead. They turn their attentions to the ones Buffy left behind.

Buffy the Vampire Slayer #45

Comic title: The Death of Buffy, part 3 

The lizard-demons try to resurrect their deceased leader and destroy the town. Buffy's friends attempt to face the threat without Buffy. Willow learns from the reptilian mystics.

Continuity

Supposed to be after Buffy season 5, following "The Gift" but before Buffy season 6 episode, "Bargaining, Part One".

Withdrawal
Originally in Buffy the Vampire Slayer #46

Story description

Buffy has returned from the grave but the D.J. vampire Velatti has also returned and seeks revenge. She has also noticed that Willow's addiction to magic is spinning out of control.

Continuity

Supposed to be in Buffy season 6, some time after the episode "Doublemeat Palace" and probably before the episode "As You Were". Withdrawal is a sequel to Creatures of Habit, but does not take place immediately after Creatures of Habit.

Canonical issues

Buffy comics such as this one are not usually considered by fans as canonical. However, unlike fan fiction, overviews summarizing their story, written early in the writing process, were approved by both Fox and Joss Whedon (or his office), and the books were therefore later published as officially Buffy/Angel merchandise.